Stache for cash is a method for raising funds by growing a mustache and seeking out pledges for a specific charitable cause.

Standard process 
Participants are notified in advance to secure participation and begin growing mustache
Some form of marketing materials—generally T-shirts or Campaign buttons—are made to distribute before the fundraiser begins.
The fundraiser lasts for 1 month 
Participants wear the campaign button and the mustache, and whenever asked about the button and 'stache, a conversation is started about the cause and participant asks the observer for a small donation

Competition 
A competition is generally held for multiple prizes. A photo contest is held for the best beard, the biggest beard, and the best attempt at a beard. Award Certificates are then issued to the winners.

A prize is also sometimes awarded for the participant that raises the most money for the cause.

References

Moustache